This is a list of track and field athletes who have moved to compete for another country. Such moves are called transfers of allegiance by the World Athletics.

To countries in Africa

To countries in the Americas

To countries in Asia

To countries in Europe

To countries in Oceania

See also

 List of sportspeople who competed for more than one nation
 Naturalized athletes of Italy

References

Citations

Sources 

Transfers of Allegiance - IAAF.org

 News stories
Kenyans running for four different nations
Another Kenyan Defects to Qatar
Ex-Kenyan Stars Face IAAF Probe

Sport of athletics-related lists
Lists of track and field athletes
Athletics